Kitty Collier is a doll created by Robert Tonner and is marketed to mainstream doll collectors.

There are two types of Kitty Collier, 18 inch Kitty with glass eyes and Tiny Kitty, a 10-inch version with painted eyes.

Kitty Collier was created shortly after Robert Tonner's Tyler Wentworth hit the market.

External links
Kitty Collier Collection Official site

Fashion dolls